Supun Tharanga (born 22 March 1986) is a Sri Lankan cricketer. He made his first-class debut for Saracens Sports Club on 9 February 2007. In August 2017, he was named in Italy's squad for the 2017 ICC World Cricket League Division Five tournament in South Africa.

References

External links
 

1986 births
Living people
Sri Lankan cricketers
Italian cricketers
Saracens Sports Club cricketers
Place of birth missing (living people)